The boys' singles of the tournament 2018 BWF World Junior Championships was held on 12–18 November. The defending champions of the last edition is Kunlavut Vitidsarn from Thailand.

Seeds 

  Kunlavut Vitidsarn (champion)
  Ikhsan Rumbay (fourth round) 
  Li Shifeng (semifinals)
  Lakshya Sen (semifinals)
  Arnaud Merklé (third round)
  Nhat Nguyen (quarterfinals)
  Bai Yupeng (second round)
  Jason Teh (third round)

  Chen Shiau-cheng (fourth round)
  Christopher Grimley (first round)
  Julien Carraggi (second round)
  Alberto Alvin Yulianto (quarterfinals)
  Lukas Resch (third round)
  Brian Yang (third round)  Joel Koh (second round)  Danylo Bosniuk (third round)''

Draw

Finals

Top half

Section 1

Section 2

Section 3

Section 4

Bottom half

Section 5

Section 6

Section 7

Section 8

References

2018 BWF World Junior Championships